R. Sands was a New Zealand cricketer. He played one first-class match for Auckland in 1905/06. Born in Yorkshire, he later played for Sydney. From his time in Sydney, he knew Sammy Jones; Jones moved to New Zealand in 1904 and coached Grafton and in the following season the Auckland Cricket Association. The Association employed Sands as their second coach for the 1905/06 season to assist Jones and it was decided that Sands would also play for the North Shore cricket club.

See also
 List of Auckland representative cricketers

References

External links
 

Year of birth missing
Year of death missing
New Zealand cricketers
Auckland cricketers
Place of birth missing
Australian cricketers
Sportspeople from Yorkshire